Throwing Muses is an album by the alternative rock band Throwing Muses. It was recorded over three weekends and released simultaneously with Kristin Hersh's solo record The Grotto on 17 March 2003. The album features Bernard Georges on bass and David Narcizo on drums as well as original bandmate Tanya Donelly on backing vocals.

Track listing
All songs written by Kristin Hersh.
 "Mercury" – 4:14
 "Pretty or Not" – 3:30
 "Civil Disobedience" – 3:13
 "Pandora's Box" – 5:20
 "Status Quo" – 4:19
 "Speed and Sleep" – 5:10
 "Portia" – 3:38
 "SolarDip" – 3:33
 "Epiphany" – 3:16
 "Los Flamingos" – 3:08
 "Half Blast" – 6:14
 "Flying" – 5:50

Personnel
Kristin Hersh – vocals and guitars
Bernard Georges – bass
David Narcizo – drums and percussion
Tanya Donelly – backing vocals on 1, 4, 9, 11 & 12

Production
Producer: Throwing Muses
Engineer: Steve Rizzo
Mixed: Ethan Allen
Design: Vaughan Oliver and Chris Bigg
Artwork: Shinro Ohtake

External links
TM2003 on throwingmusic.com
TM2003 on 4AD
Free songs from TM2003 on the artist's site

Throwing Muses albums
Throwing Muses
4AD albums